The Haas VF-20 is a Formula One racing car designed and constructed by Haas to compete during the 2020 Formula One World Championship. The car was driven by Romain Grosjean and Kevin Magnussen, who competed for Haas for the fourth consecutive year. Due to a crash in the Bahrain Grand Prix, reserve driver Pietro Fittipaldi replaced Grosjean at the Sakhir and Abu Dhabi Grands Prix. The car was planned to make its competitive debut at the 2020 Australian Grand Prix, but this was delayed when the race was cancelled and the next three events in Bahrain, Vietnam and China were postponed in response to the COVID-19 pandemic. The VF-20 made its debut at the 2020 Austrian Grand Prix.

Initial design
The Haas VF-20 is powered by the 2020 Ferrari power unit, paired to a 2019 Ferrari 8-speed gearbox. The design features several similarities to the Ferrari SF90 used by Ferrari in the 2019 Formula One World Championship.

Competition history
The beginning of the 2020 season marked a rough start for Haas as both drivers retired with brake failure. As with the previous year's entry, the VF-19, the car has struggled with consistency issues. These problems were especially apparent at the Spanish Grand Prix, with the car being two seconds slower during the race on Sunday than it was during the first practice session two days earlier. A lack of grip from the chassis, as well as a lack of power from their customer Ferrari power units, relegated Haas to the back of the grid alongside fellow Ferrari customer team, Alfa Romeo, and Williams (powered by a Mercedes engine).

Legacy
The remains of the Haas VF-20 driven by Romain Grosjean in the 2020 Bahrain Grand Prix will be put on exhibition in a new museum dedicated to Formula One in Madrid.

Complete Formula One results
(key)

Notes

  Driver failed to finish the race, but was classified as they had completed over 90% of the winner's race distance.

References

External links 

2020 Formula One season cars
VF-20